Albert C. "Snapper" Curtis  (26 January 1875 – 12 September 1933) was an Australian tennis player and medical practitioner.

Biography
Curtis was born in Adelong, New South Wales, and attended Newington College (1889–1892) where as a boarding student he was a noted sportsman. He matriculated in 1893 and became a first year medical student at the University of Sydney. In 1896, with David Edwards, Curtis won the Queensland Doubles Championship. In 1897 he was part of the University A Team in Tennis that included fellow Old Newingtonians  David Edwards and Percy Colquhoun. In that year he won the NSW Championship. Curtis was at the University of Sydney until 1902 but was only in third year in 1896 and remained there until 1899. He finally passed the deferred third year exam in 1900. Curtis moved to South Australia and graduated in medicine from the University of Adelaide in 1905. He finished runner-up to Rodney Heath in the singles final of the inaugural Australasian Championships, the future Australian Open, in 1905.

Curtis was medical superintendent of the Beechworth Asylum before his death in Melbourne on 12 September 1933, aged 58.

Grand Slam finals

Singles (1 runner-up)

References

External links
 

1875 births
1933 deaths
People educated at Newington College
University of Adelaide alumni
University of Adelaide Medical School alumni
Tennis players from Sydney
Australian male tennis players
19th-century Australian people
20th-century Australian people
People from Adelong, New South Wales